Yanbei Subdistrict is a subdistrict in Shuangta District, Chaoyang City, Liaoning, China. , it administers the following seven residential neighborhoods and two villages:
Neighborhoods
Yanbei Community
Yanhe Community
Yannan Community
Yandong Community
Yanhu Community
Yanshan Community
Yancheng Community

Villages
Erqiyingzi Village
Sanchakou Village

See also 
 List of township-level divisions of Liaoning

References 

Township-level divisions of Liaoning
Chaoyang, Liaoning